Punishment of the Grave ( ʿAdhāb al-Qabr, also translated torment of the grave)  is a Judeo-Islamic concept about the time between death and resurrection on the Day of Judgement. According to some hadiths, the souls of the unrighteous are punished by two angels in the grave, while the righteous find the grave "peaceful and blessed".

The punishment of the grave is mentioned in the Quran. Although it is mentioned in the hadiths such as those compiled by Ibn Hanbal and appears as early as the 9th century, still present among the majority of Sunnis and Shias.

A similar concept can be found in Jewish narrative, there the wicked are punished by angels of destruction, in an intermediary state between the resurrection of the dead and the individual death.

Religions

Islam 

The Quran itself gives very brief references about the period between death and the resurrection. It makes no mention of any kind of reward or punishment being given to the deceased/dead in the grave. The term Barzakh indicates that the deceased and the living are entirely separated and can not interact with each other. Otherwise Barzakh refers to the whole period between the Day of Resurrection and death and is used synonymously for "grave". Others regard barzakh as a world dividing and simultaneously connecting the realm of the dead and the living. Therefore, some Muslim traditions argue about possibilities to contact the dead by sleeping on graveyards. Despite the non-existent or at max, the brief mentionings in the Quran, Islamic tradition discusses elaborately, almost in graphic detail, as to what exactly happens before, during and after death, based on certain hadithic narrations.

After the burial each person is interrogated in the grave by two angels, called Munkar and Nakir, appointed by God to question the dead in order to test their faith. The righteous believers answer correctly and live in peace and comfort while the sinners and disbelievers fail and punishments ensue. In the life of Barzakh, the souls of the sinners and disbelievers are kept and punished in a place called Sijjin which is said to be located at the lowest level of the earth (traditionally hell, before the Day of resurrection or underworld). The books containing the full records of their deeds are also kept here. On the other hand, the souls of the righteous believers are kept in a place called Illiyin. Their books of deeds are also kept here. According to some account, Illiyin is located in the heaven. There is belief that the fire which represents the own bad deeds can already be seen during the Punishment of the Grave, and that the spiritual pain caused by this can lead to purification of the soul.

Judaism 
Rabbinic literature offer many traditions about punishing angels chastising the dead. In Jewish religious books, the souls of the wicked are punished in the hereafter by Dumah and three subordinative angels of destruction. Only on Sabbath, they are released from their sufferings. Dutch Orientalist Arent Jan Wensinck (1882-1939) argued that the Jewish tradition of punishment in the grave, belong to a period after Islam, thus this rather influenced Judaism than Judaism has influenced Islam.

See also
 Barzakh
 Islamic view of death
 Sheol (Judaism)
 Siahat-e Gharb

References

Notes

Citations

Books, etc.

External links
 The Death, Life After Death, The Signs of the Hour

Afterlife
Arabic words and phrases
Islamic terminology